Cheluvina Chittara ( Galant Design) is a 2007 Kannada-language film directed and produced by S. Narayan. Ganesh, Amoolya played the lead roles. The music was composed by Mano Murthy. This film is a remake of Tamil film Kaadhal.

Plot 
Maadesha works as a mechanic in a garage. He is liked by an innocent college-going girl Aishwarya who is the daughter of a local don Potharaju. Aishwarya is deeply in love with him and they elope. Later the gang members of Potharaju are in search of the couple. The lovers are lured by the bride's uncle, and they are taken back to Potharaju. An enraged Potharaju beats up Maadesha and takes out the Mangalsutra of Aishwarya to forcibly marry her to a person engaged earlier.

After a few years, Aishwarya while travelling with her husband and her child, comes across Maadesha where she finds him as a mentally deranged beggar roaming near a traffic signal. Aishwarya faints realizing that the beggar is Maadesha and gets admitted to the nearby hospital. At night she runs from the hospital to the same signal in search of Maadesha and she finds him sitting over there. Aishwarys cries to Maadesha and feels bad that she was responsible for his pathetic situation. Aishwarya's husband also comes to the spot and understands his wife's situation. He admits Maadesha in a mental health centre and also takes care of him.

Cast
 Ganesh as Maadesha
 Amoolya as Aishwarya (Aishu)
 Komal Kumar
 Kaadhal Krishnamurthy
 Suresh Chandra
 R.G. Vijayasarathi
 Manikantha Surya 
 Appu Venkatesh 
 Sardhar Sathya
 Pipeline Ramesh 
 Asharani
 Jaishri Raj
 Gowramma

Soundtrack

Mano Murthy composed the music for the film and soundtracks. The album has six soundtracks.

The song "Janumada Gelathi" is reused from the original soundtrack "Unakena Irupen" composed by Joshua Sridhar.

Reception 
A critic from Sify wrote that "Brilliant director S. Narayan seems to have lost his magic touch, as his latest film Cheluvina Chittara, a remake of that brilliant Tamil film Kadhal is unimpressive and lacks nativity". A critic from Rediff.com wrote that "Cheluvina Chiththaara will certainly work for the family audience as it is clean and natural, but its success will depend on how the audience accepts the last few reels of the film".

Box-office 
It completed 175 days and grossed an approximately 30 crore. After the success of this film, Ganesh earned the moniker 'Golden Star'.

References

External links
 
 Official site

2000s Kannada-language films
2007 films
Kannada remakes of Tamil films
Films scored by Mano Murthy
Films directed by S. Narayan